Hōne Riiwi Tōia (1858 – 9 August 1933) was a notable Māori tribal leader, prophet, religious leader and protester of New Zealand. He identified with the Ngāpuhi iwi. He was born in Waimate North, Northland, in about 1858. His paternal grandfather was a Jewish trader named Levy (Riiwi) who visited the Hokianga.

Tōia led the tax revolt sometimes called the Dog Tax War and was arrested in 1898 and imprisoned for 18 months.

References

1858 births
1933 deaths
New Zealand Māori religious leaders
People from the Bay of Islands
Ngāpuhi people
New Zealand activists